Prospect Hill is a hill in Waltham, Massachusetts, United States, and is the third-highest point within  of downtown Boston.  The hill is in Prospect Hill Park on the west side of Waltham, near Route 128.  It is exceeded in height by Great Blue Hill and Chickatawbut Hill, both in the Blue Hills Reservation. It is not to be confused with the much lower, historically significant Prospect Hill near Union Square in Somerville.

Both summits provide some of the best views of the Boston basin. In clear weather, Monadnock, 54 miles away, is visible in an approximately northwest direction. The hill and the surrounding area make up the  Prospect Hill Park, a municipal park with numerous hiking trails and picnic areas that is the oldest and largest public open space in Waltham.

History
This area comprised the two peaks and their immediate surroundings. Additional land was purchased over several decades and the park reached  in 1927. It was improved with trails, picnic areas, fences and other amenities and generally well maintained through the first half of the 20th century. Vegetation management included the clearing of dead trees and underbrush, as well as the planting of thousands of trees. As a result of additional land purchases, the parked reached 250 acres by 1997. Its current size is 273 acres.

In 2021, the main park entrance from Totten Pond Road was temporarily closed as construction began on a capital improvement project to add "a water spray park, children’s playground area, picnic area, pavilion, multipurpose half court and a gaga pit". Construction is expected to be complete in Fall 2021, when planning for a second phase of improvements will begin.

Ski slope
Additional land was added in 1948 for a ski slope.  Slope construction was performed mostly by volunteers and included lights for night skiing.  Natural snow cover was poor and there was little utilization due to insufficient snow for many years until snow making equipment was installed in 1968.  A T-Bar was also added at that time.  The ski area was popular for area residents learning to ski and was also convenient for those wanting to ski at night.  The ski slopes were open from 1949 to 1987.  The area reopened briefly in 1989–90 and has been closed since.  The slope was operated by the city of Waltham until 1985.  Thereafter, the facility was leased to private operators.

Due to the topography of Big Prospect, a very unusual configuration existed, with the novice area above a much steeper expert slope.

Nearby development

The former headquarters of the Polaroid Corporation was located adjacent to the southwest corner of Prospect Hill Park.  The site was vacant for many years, until construction began in 2013 of "1265 Main," a mixed use retail and office project.  The first phase of the project, including retail space and the U. S. headquarters of Clarks footwear, opened in 2016.  Construction of Phase 2 began in 2019.

Water tanks

In 1974, the city of Waltham built two water tanks near the summit of Big Prospect to hold eight million gallons of water.  Their elevation guarantees good water pressure throughout the city.

Other towers

In 1917, a fire tower (used for the visual location of forest fires) was constructed on Big Prospect.  Beginning in 1951, the United States Air Force utilized Big Prospect for research purposes.  They erected a large parabolic dish antenna in 1963.  This necessitated relocation of the fire tower to Little Prospect. This tower also became the location for the city's fire radio transmitters, and later for equipment of the Waltham Amateur Radio Association.  

Projects included Experimental SAGE Subsector in the 1950s and the Joint Tactical Information Distribution System in the 1970s.

In 1997, the Air Force vacated Prospect Hill Park, and in 2002 all radio equipment was relocated to Big Prospect, serving Waltham's fire, police, public works, parks and recreation departments, the Massachusetts Army National Guard, the Civil Air Patrol, and the Waltham Amateur Radio Association.

Gallery

References

External link

Hills of Massachusetts